Island of the Sharks is a 1999 IMAX film, produced by Michele Hall and directed by Howard Hall, documenting life under the surface around Cocos Island. The film has a 40-minute runtime. The island is a nexus for marine animals of many kinds including many varieties of sharks, manta rays, marlin, dolphins, whales, and sea turtles. The film depicts the whitetip reef shark, the hammerhead shark, the blacktip shark, and the silky shark, among others. The movie's music was composed by Alan Williams. The film was narrated by Linda Hunt.

References

1999 films
1999 documentary films
IMAX short films
Films set in Costa Rica
1999 short films
Films shot in Costa Rica

IMAX documentary films